USS Laub (DD-613) was a  in the United States Navy during World War II. She was the second ship named for Henry Laub, who was killed during the Battle of Lake Erie in 1813.

Laub was laid down 1 May 1941 by Bethlehem Shipbuilding, San Pedro, California; launched 28 April 1942; sponsored by Miss Barbara Mohun Handley, a collateral descendant of Henry Laub; and commissioned 24 October 1942.

Service history
After shakedown along the west coast, Laub steamed through the Panama Canal, arriving Norfolk, Virginia 1 February 1943. She departed New York 7 February, escorting a convoy to North Africa. After reaching Casablanca, the destroyer patrolled the African coast until departing 14 March with a return convoy to the United States.

The following month, she sailed with another convoy. On 26 May, while escorting a return convoy, she joined other escorts in chasing off an enemy U-boat set on attacking the vulnerable supply ships in the convoy. The destroyer departed New York on her third extended voyage 11 June to join Allied forces in north Africa preparing for the invasion of Sicily. On 5 July she sailed from Oran to screen the transports and their passage to the strategic Sicilian beaches.

The amphibious force arrived off Sicily 4 days later, made a dramatic night landing, and the next day fought off Nazi aircraft. On the 11th, while bombarding the shore, Laub assisted in downing an aircraft. Continuing fire support operations, Laub destroyed four tanks and damaged strategic bridges.

The destroyer returned to Mers el Kebir 15 July and continued operations in the Mediterranean Sea until joining a convoy for America on 28 July. Laub made additional convoy runs to north Africa and the United Kingdom before returning to Oran to support the Allied campaigns in the Mediterranean.

Off north Africa 6 November, six planes made a torpedo attack on Laubs convoy, scoring several hits. Laub proceeded to assist the stricken ships, Beatty, Maraix, and Ruys, and rescued 341 survivors. From November 1943 until April 1944, the destroyer continued escort operations in the Mediterranean, and made several cross-Atlantic cruises from New York to the British Isles.

On the 23rd while bombarding the Italian coast, Laub collided with Philadelphia. Following temporary repairs at Naples and additional ones at Boston, Massachusetts the destroyer was back in Oran 2 December.

For the rest of the European campaign, she performed escort and fire support missions off the French-Italian coast. Departing Oran 15 May 1945, she reached Boston on the 23rd and began training in the Caribbean in preparation for Pacific duty. Laub returned to Casco Bay, Maine, when the Japanese surrender was announced.

The destroyer arrived Charleston, South Carolina, 2 November and decommissioned there 2 February 1946, joining the Atlantic Reserve Fleet. Laub was stricken from the Naval Register on 1 July 1971.  She was then sold on 14 January 1975, and broken up for scrap.

Awards
Laub received four battle stars for World War II service.

References

External links
    history.navy.mil: USS Laub
        navsource.org: USS Laub
  hazegray.org: USS Laub

Benson-class destroyers
Ships built in Los Angeles
1942 ships
World War II destroyers of the United States